Elizabeth II (21 April 1926 – 8 September 2022) held numerous titles and honours, both during and before her time as monarch of each of her Commonwealth realms. Each is listed below; where two dates are shown, the first indicates the date of receiving the title or award (the title as Princess Elizabeth of York
being given as from her birth), and the second indicates the date of its loss or renunciation.

Royal titles and styles

 21 April 192611 December 1936: Her Royal Highness Princess Elizabeth of York
 11 December 193620 November 1947: Her Royal Highness The Princess Elizabeth
 20 November 19476 February 1952: Her Royal Highness The Princess Elizabeth, Duchess of Edinburgh
 6 February 19528 September 2022: Her Majesty The Queen

Upon Elizabeth's accession to the throne, she was asked by her Private Secretary what her regnal name would be, to which she responded, "My own, of coursewhat else?" Until 1953, her official style was by the Grace of God, of Great Britain, Ireland and the British Dominions beyond the Seas, Queen, Defender of the Faith. She was proclaimed as queen using that title in Canada and South Africa, whereas, in Australia, New Zealand, and the United Kingdom, she was proclaimed as Queen Elizabeth the Second, by the Grace of God Queen of this Realm and of Her other Realms and Territories, Head of the Commonwealth, Defender of the Faith.

A decision was reached by Elizabeth's prime ministers at the Commonwealth Prime Ministers' Conference of 1952, whereby the Queen would accord herself different styles and titles in each of her realms, reflecting that in each state she acted as monarch of that particular country, regardless of her other roles. Canada's preferred format was: Elizabeth the Second, by the Grace of God, Queen of Canada and of Her other realms and territories, Head of the Commonwealth, Defender of the Faith. However, as Australia wished to have the United Kingdom mentioned in all the Queen's titles, the resolution reached was a designation that included the United Kingdom as well as, for the first time, separate reference to the other Commonwealth realms. Thereafter, separate but parallel royal styles and titles acts were passed in each of the Commonwealth realms, granting Elizabeth a distinct but similarly constituted title in each state, meaning that when Elizabeth was crowned in the same year, she held seven separate titles.

With further evolution of the Commonwealth since that time, Elizabeth held at the time of her death 15 different regnal titles, one for each of the current Commonwealth realms. In all realms other than Canada and Grenada, the reference to the United Kingdom has been removed; Australia doing so in 1973, in contrast to the Australian government's position 20 years earlier. Traditionally, the Queen's titles are listed in the order in which the realms other than the United Kingdom (the original realm) first became Dominions—namely, Canada (1867), Australia (1901), and New Zealand (1907)—followed by the rest in the order in which the former colony became an independent realm: Jamaica (1962), The Bahamas (1973), Grenada (1974), Papua New Guinea (1975), the Solomon Islands (1978), Tuvalu (1978), Saint Lucia (1979), Saint Vincent and the Grenadines (1979), Belize (1981), Antigua and Barbuda (1981) and Saint Kitts and Nevis (1983).

Queen Elizabeth I controversy

Though the situation was the same in every one of the Queen's realms beyond the United Kingdom, only within Scotland did the title Elizabeth II cause controversy as there had never been an Elizabeth I in Scotland. In an act of sabotage, new Royal Mail post boxes in Scotland, bearing the royal cypher EIIR, were vandalised, after which, to avoid further problems, post boxes and Royal Mail vehicles in Scotland bore only the Crown of Scotland. A legal case, MacCormick v. Lord Advocate (1953 SC 396), was taken to contest the right of the Queen to title herself Elizabeth II within Scotland, arguing that to do so would be a breach of the Act of Union. The case, however, was lost on the grounds that the pursuers had not title to sue the Crown and the numbering of monarchs was part of the Royal Prerogative, and thus not governed by the Act of Union. It was suggested by Winston Churchill that future British monarchs should be numbered according to either their English or Scottish predecessors, whichever number is higher.

At the opening ceremony of the devolved Scottish Parliament in Edinburgh in 1999, attended by the Queen, the Presiding Officer Lord Steel said at the close of his opening address: "It is good that today, once again, we the elected representatives of the people are able to welcome your majesty, not only as Queen of the United Kingdom, but seated as you are among us, to greet you in the historic and constitutionally correct manner, with warmth and affection, as Queen of Scots." In 2002 Winnie Ewing, then president of the Scottish National Party, wrote to the Queen asking her to adopt the title "Elizabeth I" in Scotland.

Other realms adopted the style "Queen Elizabeth II" despite never having been ruled by Queen Elizabeth I of England.

The Queen's British styles and titles were read out at her funeral by David White, Garter Principal King of Arms, as follows: 

The Queen's New Zealand styles and titles were read out at the State Memorial Service at the Wellington Cathedral on 26 September by Phillip O'Shea, New Zealand Herald of Arms Extraordinary, as follows:

Regnal titles

Other

Other titles

Military ranks

 24 February26 July 1945: Hon. Second Subaltern,  Auxiliary Territorial Service
 26 July 194524 July 1947: Hon. Junior Commander, Auxiliary Territorial Service
 24 July 19471 February 1949: Hon. Senior Controller, Auxiliary Territorial Service
 1 February 1949March 1950: Hon. Senior Controller, Women's Royal Army Corps

Commonwealth of Nations honours

Commonwealth realms

Appointments

Decorations and medals

Other Commonwealth countries

Appointments

Decorations and medals

Foreign honours

Appointments

Dynastic orders

Decorations

Honorary military positions
 Australia
  19532022: Captain-General of the Royal Regiment of Australian Artillery
  19532022: Colonel-in-Chief of the Royal Australian Engineers
  19532022: Colonel-in-Chief of the Royal Australian Infantry Corps
  19532022: Colonel-in-Chief of the Royal Australian Army Ordnance Corps
  19532022: Colonel-in-Chief of the Royal Australian Army Nursing Corps
  19532022: Air-Commodore-in-Chief of the Australian Citizen Air Force

 Canada
  19472022: Colonel-in-Chief of le Régiment de la Chaudière
  19472022: Colonel-in-Chief of the 48th Highlanders of Canada
  19502022: Colonel-in-Chief of the Argyll and Sutherland Highlanders of Canada (Princess Louise's)
  19522022: Captain-General of the Royal Regiment of Canadian Artillery
  19532022: Colonel-in-Chief of the Governor General's Horse Guards
  19532022: Colonel-in-Chief of the King's Own Calgary Regiment
  19531967: Colonel-in-Chief Corps of Royal Canadian Engineers
  19532022: Colonel-in-Chief of the Royal 22e Régiment
  19532022: Colonel-in-Chief of the Governor General's Foot Guards
  19532022: Colonel-in-Chief of the Canadian Grenadier Guards
  19531956: Colonel-in-Chief of the Carleton and York Regiment
  19532022: Colonel-in-Chief of the Canadian Guards
  19562022: Colonel-in-Chief of the Royal New Brunswick Regiment
  19581968: Colonel-in-Chief of the Royal Canadian Ordnance Corps
  19772022: Colonel-in-Chief of the Military Engineers Branch
  19812022: Colonel-in-Chief of the Calgary Highlanders
  2013 - 2022: Colonel-in-Chief of the Stormont, Dundas and Glengarry Highlanders
  19531968: Air-Commodore-in-Chief of the Air Reserve Canada
  19532012: Honorary Commissioner of the Royal Canadian Mounted Police
  20122022: Commissioner-in-Chief of the Royal Canadian Mounted Police

 Fiji
  19701987: Colonel-in-Chief of the Royal Fiji Military Forces

 Ghana
  19591960: Colonel-in-Chief of the Ghana Regiment of Infantry

 New Zealand
  19532022: Captain-General of the Royal Regiment of New Zealand Artillery
  19532022: Captain-General of the Royal New Zealand Armoured Corps
  19532022: Colonel-in-Chief of the Corps of Royal New Zealand Engineers
  19531964: Colonel-in-Chief of the Countess of Ranfurly's Own Auckland Regiment
  19531964: Colonel-in-Chief of the Wellington Regiment (City of Wellington's Own)
  19642022: Colonel-in-Chief of the Royal New Zealand Infantry Regiment
  19771996: Colonel-in-Chief Royal of the New Zealand Army Ordnance Corps
  19532022: Air-Commodore-in-Chief of the Territorial Air Force of New Zealand

 South Africa
  19471961: Colonel-in-Chief of the Royal Durban Light Infantry
  19471961: Colonel-in-Chief of the South African Railways and Harbours Brigade
  19521961: Colonel-in-Chief of the Imperial Light Horse
  19531961: Colonel-in-Chief of the Royal Natal Carbineers
  19531961: Colonel-in-Chief of the Kaffrarian Rifles

 United Kingdom
  19421952: Colonel of the Grenadier Guards
  19472006: Colonel-in-Chief of the Argyll and Sutherland Highlanders (Princess Louise's)
  19471994: Colonel-in-Chief of the 16th/5th Queen's Royal Lancers
  19492022: Honorary Brigadier of the Women's Royal Army Corps
  19522022: Colonel-in-Chief of The Life Guards
  19521969: Colonel-in-Chief of the Royal Horse Guards
  19522022: Colonel-in-Chief of the Grenadier Guards
  19522022: Colonel-in-Chief of the Coldstream Guards
  19522022: Colonel-in-Chief of the Scots Guards
  19522022: Colonel-in-Chief of the Irish Guards
  19522022: Colonel-in-Chief of the Welsh Guards
  19522022: Captain-General of the Royal Regiment of Artillery
  19522022: Colonel-in-Chief of the Corps of Royal Engineers
  19522022: Captain-General of the Honourable Artillery Company
  19522022: Master of the Merchant Navy and Fishing Fleets
  19531971: Colonel-in-Chief of the Royal Scots Greys
  19532022: Colonel-in-Chief of the Royal Tank Regiment
  19532006: Colonel-in-Chief of the Royal Welch Fusiliers
  19531970: Colonel-in-Chief of the Loyal Regiment
  19531966: Colonel-in-Chief of the King's Royal Rifle Corps
  19531956: Colonel-in-Chief of the Royal Army Ordnance Corps
  19531956: Honorary Colonel of the Queen's Own Worcestershire Hussars
  19532022: Captain-General of the Combined Cadet Force
  19531959: Colonel-in-Chief of the Royal West African Frontier Force
  19531964: Colonel-in-Chief of the King's African Rifles
  19531964: Colonel-in-Chief of the Northern Rhodesia Regiment
  19531974: Colonel-in-Chief of the Royal Malta Artillery
  19531972: Colonel-in-Chief of the King's Own Malta Regiment
  19531970: Colonel-in-Chief of the Royal Rhodesia Regiment
  19531992: Colonel-in-Chief of the Duke of Lancaster's Own Yeomanry
  19561963: Colonel-in-Chief of the Queen's Own Nigeria Regiment
  19562022: Honorary Colonel of the Queen's Own Warwickshire and Worcestershire Yeomanry
  19591963: Colonel-in-Chief of the Royal Nigerian Military Forces
  19591971: Colonel-in-Chief of the Royal Sierra Leone Military Forces
  19642022: Colonel-in-Chief of the Malawi Rifles
 1 April 196410 June 2011: Lord High Admiral of the United Kingdom
  19662007: Colonel-in-Chief of the Royal Green Jackets
  19692022: Colonel-in-Chief of the Blues and Royals (Royal Horse Guards and 1st Dragoons)
  19702006: Colonel-in-Chief of the Queen's Lancashire Regiment
  19712022: Colonel-in-Chief of the Royal Scots Dragoon Guards
  19711999: Colonel-in-Chief of the Queen's Own Yeomanry
  19731992: Colonel-in-Chief of the Queen's Own Mercian Yeomanry
  19772022: Colonel-in-Chief of the Corps of Royal Military Police
  19922022: Patron of the Royal Army Chaplains' Department
  19922022: Colonel-in-Chief of the Adjutant General's Corps
  19932022: Affiliated Colonel-in-Chief of the Queen's Gurkha Engineers
  19932022: Colonel-in-Chief of the Queen's Royal Lancers
  19942014: Colonel-in-Chief of the Royal Mercian and Lancastrian Yeomanry
  20062022: Colonel-in-Chief of the Royal Welsh
  20062022: Colonel-in-Chief of the Royal Regiment of Scotland
  20062022: Colonel-in-Chief of the Duke of Lancaster's Regiment
  20062022: Royal Colonel of the Argyll and Sutherland Highlanders, 5th Battalion, The Royal Regiment of Scotland
  19531996: Air-Commodore-in-Chief of the Royal Observer Corps
  19532022: Air-Commodore-in-Chief of the Royal Auxiliary Air Force
  19532022: Air-Commodore-in-Chief of the Royal Air Force Regiment
  19532022: Commandant-in-Chief of the Royal Air Force College, Cranwell
  19772022: Royal Honorary Air Commodore of the Royal Air Force Marham
  20002022: Royal Honorary Air Commodore of the 603 (City of Edinburgh) Squadron

Non-national titles and honours

Freedom of the City
Commonwealth realms
  11 June 1947: London
  5 July 1947: Royal Borough of Windsor and Maidenhead
  16 July 1947: Edinburgh
  20 September 1947: Royal Burgh of Stirling
  27 May 1948: Cardiff
  26 May 1949: Belfast
  10 October 1951: Ottawa

Foreign
  1976: Philadelphia
  27 February 1983: Long Beach, California
  1988: Madrid

Memberships and fellowships

Scholastic

Degrees

Others
In 1975 she received the highest distinction of the Scout Association of Japan, the Golden Pheasant Award.

In April 2013, the Queen was presented with an honorary BAFTA award by Sir Kenneth Branagh in a ceremony at Windsor Castle. The BAFTA was given for her "lifelong support of the British film and television industry".

On 21 June 2022, the Queen was presented with the Canterbury Cross by the Archbishop of Canterbury "for unstinting support of the Church throughout her reign."

She received the International Federation for Equestrian Sports (FEI) Lifetime Achievement Award for her dedication to equestrian sports.

See also
 Style of the British sovereign
 Style and title of the Canadian sovereign
 List of things named after Elizabeth II
 List of titles and honours of Charles III
 List of titles and honours of Queen Camilla
 List of titles and honours of Anne, Princess Royal
 List of titles and honours of William, Prince of Wales
 List of titles and honours of Prince Philip, Duke of Edinburgh
 List of titles and honours of George VI
 List of titles and honours of Queen Elizabeth The Queen Mother
 List of titles and honours of Mary of Teck
 List of titles and honours of Prince Arthur, Duke of Connaught and Strathearn
 List of honours of the British royal family by country
 Flags of Elizabeth II

Notes

References

External links
 Hansard recording of debate on the royal title in the British House of Commons, 3 March 1953

Titles and honours
Lists of titles by person of the United Kingdom
British monarchy-related lists
BAFTA winners (people)
Collars of the Order of the Liberator General San Martin
Collars of the Order of the White Lion
Honorary Companions of Honour with Collar of the National Order of Merit (Malta)
Companions of the Order of the Crown of India
Grand Collars of the Order of Saint James of the Sword
Grand Cordons of the Order of Valour
Grand Croix of the Légion d'honneur
Recipients of the Order of the Tower and Sword
3
3
3
Recipients of the Grand Star of the Decoration for Services to the Republic of Austria
Grand Crosses of the Order of Merit of the Republic of Hungary (civil)
Grand Crosses of the Order of Merit of the Republic of Poland
Grand Crosses with Golden Chain of the Order of Vytautas the Great
Grand Crosses of the Order of the Sun of Peru
Grand Commanders of the Order of the Niger
Knights Grand Cross with Collar of the Order of Merit of the Italian Republic
Knights of the Golden Fleece of Spain
Honorary Companions of the Order of the Star of Ghana
Recipients of the Collar of the Order of the Cross of Terra Mariana
Recipients of the Darjah Utama Temasek
Grand Crosses Special Class of the Order of Merit of the Federal Republic of Germany
Commonwealth royal styles
First Class of the Order of the Star of Romania
Recipients of the Order of the White Eagle (Poland)
Knights Grand Cross of the Order of the Falcon
Recipients of orders, decorations, and medals of Ethiopia
Recipients of orders, decorations, and medals of Sudan

fr:Élisabeth II#Titres et honneurs